Josina Morita is an American politician who currently serves as a member of the Cook County Board of Commissioners for the 13th district. The 13th district includes the West Ridge and Rogers Park areas of the City of Chicago as well as the suburbs of Evanston, Glencoe, Glenview, Kenilworth, Lincolnwood, Morton Grove, Northbrook, Northfield, Skokie, Wilmette, and Winnetka.

In 2016, she was elected to a six-year term as a member of the Metropolitan Water Reclamation District Board of Greater Chicago. In 2022, Morita won election to the Cook County Board of Commissioners, and took office on November 20, 2022. She is the first Asian American to serve on both bodies.

Cook County Commissioner 
In May 2021, Morita launched a campaign to replace retiring Cook County Commissioner Larry Suffredin in the 2022 election. She won the Democratic primary uncontested, and defeated Republican candidate Andrew Border in the general election. She stated that her goals as Commissioner include environmental justice, constituent outreach, and changing the county's data collection practices to collect more precise data on Asian American ethnic groups and to create a Middle Eastern and North African category.

Morita is the chair of the Illinois Asian American Caucus, whose members include state representatives Jennifer Gong-Gershowitz and Theresa Mah and state senator Ram Villivalam. In response to discrimination during the COVID-19 pandemic and the 2021 Atlanta spa shootings, Morita and the Caucus urged state and local officials to act to combat anti-Asian American violence and prejudice.

Morita is a founding member of the Illinois Mamas Caucus, an organization formed in April 2021 to support elected officials who are mothers and to advocate for "policies that support working families, protect female and maternal health, provide high-quality public education and make it easier for women to run for elected office."

Electoral history

Personal life 
Morita lives in Skokie with her husband and two children.

References 

Illinois local politicians